Theni Government Medical College and Hospital is a teaching hospital in Theni district, Tamil Nadu, India. It was established in 2004.

The college is situated on the NH 85, at a distance of 9 km from the district capitol Theni, and 7 km from Aundipatty.

History
The foundation for Government Theni Medical College was laid on 16 August 2002 by then Chief Minister Dr. J. Jayalalitha, and the first hospital and college premises were inaugurated on 8 December 2004.
 
In 2006, the first 100 students were admitted to the MBBS programme.

College
In addition to the MBBS programme, the college offers diplomas for paramedics, medical laboratory technologists, and nurses, and specialist training for MDs.

The college is affiliated with the Tamil Nadu Dr. M.G.R. Medical University, which belongs to the Government of Tamil Nadu. It is accredited by the MCI. Oversight is provided by the Department of Health and Family Welfare, Government of Tamil Nadu.

In the college grounds are hostels for undergraduate and postgraduate students.

College departments
 Anatomy 
 Physiology
 Biochemistry
 Microbiology
 Pathology
 Pharmacology
 Forensic Medicine
 Social and Preventive Medicine

Hospital 
The hospital has 900 beds and an outpatient ward.

Hospital departments
 Medicine
 Surgery
 OG
 Pediatrics
 Surgery
 Neurology
 Neurosurgery
 Orthopedics 
 Dental
 Psychiatry
 ENT
 Ophthalmology
 TB centre
 Skin
 STD
 ICTC
 ART
 Radiology
 Casualty
 Central Lab.

See also
 List of Tamil Nadu Government's Educational Institutions

References

Medical colleges in Tamil Nadu
Theni district
Educational institutions established in 2004
2004 establishments in Tamil Nadu